Kaylon Nakia Ford Jr. (born November 19, 1995) is an American football defensive end for the Seattle Seahawks of the National Football League (NFL). Ford was a standout at Hilton Head Island High School. He initially committed to the University of Louisville but changed his commitment when coach Charlie Strong left Louisville to take the head coaching job at the University of Texas. He played college football at Texas, where he was the 2017 Big 12 Conference Defensive Lineman of the Year, and signed with the Seahawks as an undrafted free agent in 2018.

College career
Ford attended the University of Texas and played for the Longhorns from 2014 to 2017.In his freshman year Ford played in 7 games and had 9 total tackles and 1 tackle for loss. He improved in his sophomore year tallying a total of 39 tackles, 6 tackles for loss and 2.5 sacks in 10 games. In his junior year he had a college career high 54 total tackles and 5.5 tackles for loss through 12 games. In his senior year, Ford had his best year as he racked up a total of 31 tackles, 8 tackles for loss, and 1.5 sacks, earning him the Big 12 Defensive Lineman of the Year award.

Professional career

Ford signed with the Seattle Seahawks as an undrafted free agent following the 2018 NFL Draft. He made the Seahawks' 53-man roster as an undrafted rookie. He made his NFL debut in Week 2 against the Chicago Bears. He made his first NFL start in Week 13 against the San Francisco 49ers. He appeared in 11 games in his rookie season. He finished with 21 total tackles (13 solo, 8 combined).

In the 2019 season, Ford appeared in 15 games and started 14. He finished with .5 sacks, 32 total tackles, one pass defensed, and one fumble recovery. In the 2020 season, Ford started in all 16 games. He finished with two sacks, 40 total tackles, and one forced fumble.

The Seahawks placed a second-round restricted free agent tender on Ford on March 17, 2021. The Seahawks later signed him to a two-year contract extension.  In the 2021 season, Ford started in all 17 games. He finished with two sacks, 53 total tackles, and one pass defensed. In the 2022 season, Ford started in all 17 games. He finished with three sacks, 35 total tackles, and two passes defensed.

References

External links

Seattle Seahawks bio
Texas Longhorns bio

1995 births
Living people
People from Hilton Head, South Carolina
Players of American football from South Carolina
American football defensive tackles
Texas Longhorns football players
Seattle Seahawks players